A free kick in Australian rules football is a penalty awarded by a field umpire to a player who has been infringed by an opponent or is the nearest player to a player from the opposite team who has broken a rule.

Protocol
When a free kick is paid, the player's opponent stands the mark, by standing on the spot where the umpire indicates that the free kick was paid or mark was taken. The player with the ball then retreats backwards so that the ball can be kicked over the player standing the mark; the player must retreat on the angle such that he, the man on the mark and the centre of the attacking goal are in the same straight line.

A player receiving a free kick is not restricted to kicking the ball; he can play on by handballing to another player, or run around the mark where the free kick has been paid.

Examples of free kicks
Free kicks are paid for:
 Holding the ball: when the player with the ball is tackled and cannot dispose of the ball legally despite having had a prior opportunity to do so; or when a player lying on the ground drags the ball underneath his body and does not attempt to dispose of it.
 Running too far: when the player runs with the ball for more than 15 metres but does not bounce it or touch it on the ground, or dispose of it.
 High contact: when any other player on the field makes contact above another player's shoulders. Can take the form of a High Tackle when the tackler makes contact on above the shoulders (A notable exception is when players deliberately duck their head to attract a free kick, an umpire may ignore the high contact and call play on). A player in possession may also commit this offense when attempting a fend off. 
 Holding the man: holding or tackling a player who doesn't have the ball.
 Tripping: when the player is tackled below the knees.
 Push in the back: pushing a player in the back is not allowed (in a marking contest, ruck duel or tackle).
 Taking or chopping the arms: attempting to spoil a mark by pulling away one's opponent's arm.
 Out on the full: when the ball is kicked and travels over the boundary line before bouncing or being touched by another player.
 Deliberate out of bounds/deliberate rushed behind: when the ball is forced out of bounds in a blatantly deliberate act.
 Throwing the ball/illegal disposal: when the ball is thrown or otherwise incorrectly disposed of, rather than handballed.
 Illegal shepherd: when a player is illegally bumped by a player in a marking or ruck contest who makes no legitimate effort to contest the ball.
 Kicking/Kicking in danger: kicking an opponent or near an opponent in a manner likely to cause injury, usually while attempting to kick the football off the ground.
 Centre square infringement: any player other than the four midfielders entering the centre square before the centre bounce.
 Interchange infringement: when a player enters the arena without following interchange protocol.
 Runner interference: paid against a runner, trainer or other club official who impedes the play as part of his or her normal on-ground duties.

Playing On
A player taking a free kick is allowed to take his kick or handpass unimpeded unless the umpire calls play on. Play on will be called if:
the player runs off his line; i.e. off the direct line between the man on the mark and the centre of the goals.
the player runs over his mark; i.e. if the man on the mark has not set himself and the player runs towards his goals. This often happens deliberately if the player is pressing an advantage (such as setting up a goal kick while the opposing players are not yet in position to defend).
the player takes too long to take his kick or handpass. Typically, this is after ten seconds for any free kick around the ground, and thirty seconds for a set shot at goals inside the 50 metre line. Some players abuse this disparity in their forward lines by taking thirty seconds to take a set shot, then playing on or passing short anyway.
The umpire has sole discretion over whether he believes the player has played on. Once a player plays on, he can be pursued by any opposition players. While the man on the mark can advance to hurry his disposal, he is most vulnerable to being tackled from a player pursuing from behind.

Advantage
Players may ignore the whistle that indicates a free kick has been awarded and play on, if play is continuous. If stopping play is disadvantageous to the team receiving the free kick, then advantage is paid to that team, if that team elects to take the advantage. The umpire does not decide on advantage, unless play is not continuous. An example of this is when a player tackles his opponent, the ball spills free and is collected by a player on the tackler's team and the ball is moved downfield.  In this case, stopping the game for the free kick would penalise the team that earns the free kick, hence advantage is paid. A player cannot change his mind once he has elected to take the advantage. Advantage cannot be paid from a mark. This rule was first applied in 2010.

Moving the spot of a free kick
Free kicks are generally paid at the spot of the foul or mark, but the spot of the free kick can be shifted under the following four circumstances.

Free kicks in the goal square
The spot of any free kick paid in the attacking goal square is moved so that the kick was taken from directly in front, rather than being lined up with the centre of the goal-line as would occur elsewhere on the ground – since this would result in close range shots often being taken from very wide angles. This interpretation was introduced in 2006 – prior to this, wide angle shots were required in these circumstances.

Free kicks near the defensive goal
If a defender receives a free kick behind the "nine-metre line" – which is the imaginary extension of the kick-off line (which forms the top of the defensive goal square) in both directions to the boundary line – the position of the man-on-the-mark is brought forward to the nine-metre line.

Off-the-ball free kicks
If a free kick is awarded for a rules infringement which does not involve the ball-carrier or a contest for the ball, it is said to be off-the-ball. An off-the-ball free kick will be paid either to the infringed player at the spot of the infringement, or to the closest player at the spot of the ball at the time of the infringement, depending upon which is the bigger penalty for the team that infringed.

Downfield free kicks
If a rules infringement occurs against a player after he has disposed of the football but before another player receives it (typically a late bump), the umpire can award a downfield free kick. Free kicks are generally awarded either where the free kick occurs or where the football is at the time of the infringement, whichever is the greater penalty against the offending team. A downfield free kick is often awarded where the ball lands, despite that not being specified in Section 18.1.2 of the laws, which define the awarding of free kicks. The nearest player to the ball where and when the free kick is awarded takes the free kick. A split-second decision is made regarding whether an infringement occurred after the disposal, resulting in a downfield free kick, or before the disposal occurs, resulting in an on-the-spot free kick (unless advantage is paid on the result of the kick).

If a player is infringed after disposal and would have taken part in the next act of play, the attacking team receives a 50 metre penalty from where the infringement occurred rather than a downfield free kick.

50-metre penalty

If play has stopped for a free kick or mark, and a second infringement occurs before the free kick has been taken, then a 50-metre penalty is awarded, which moves the spot of the original free kick 50m closer to the goal-line. The second infringement is usually against the player who has the original free kick (e.g. for slowing play down by running across the mark, or by a late hit after a mark), but the same rule applies for any second infringement occurring anywhere on the field. In the latter circumstance, the greater penalty of a 50m-penalty or a free kick at the spot of the second infringement is applied.

The "Protected Area"
When a player takes a free kick, the laws of the game stipulated that a protected area exists around him. The protected area is the corridor ten metres to either side of the ball-carrier backwards from the mark, including a ten metre semicircle behind the player with the ball. The laws of the game state that no player from either team is allowed within the protected area zone until the free kick is taken or play-on is called. If a player from the attacking team is within the zone, the umpire will blow time off until he leaves the zone; if a player from the defending team is within the zone, a 50-metre penalty is applied, unless he is following an opponent within 2 metres.

The protected zone has varied in size and shape over the history of the game, and was most recently adjusted in 2016 when it was increased from five metres to ten metres.

Staging
Players may attempt to deliberately drawing contact to the head or fall forward from a push in an attempt to stage for a free kick, similar to diving or flopping in soccer and other codes. In the AFL, such infractions may be penalised with fines by the tribunal.

References

Australian rules football terminology
Laws of Australian rules football